Lieutenant-General Christopher J. Coates CMM MSM CD is a former military officer of the Royal Canadian Air Force. In July 2020 he replaced Lieutenant-General Michael Rouleau as commander of Canadian Joint Operations Command. From July 2018 until July 2020, he was the deputy commander of North American Aerospace Defense Command succeeding Lieutenant-General Pierre St-Amand.

He graduated from post-secondary education at University of Calgary in chemistry and biochemistry.

He was trained as a pilot upon joining the RCAF, starting as a reconnaissance pilot flying light observation helicopters with 444 Squadron in Lahr, Germany, 430 Squadron in Valcartier, Québec, 408 Squadron in Edmonton, Alberta and 427 Squadron in Petawawa, Ontario.

He was the operations officer with 10 Tactical Air Group in St Hubert, and director of CAOC in Winnipeg, 1 Wing in Kingston.

On March 22, 2021, Coates announced his retirement from the Canadian Armed Forces. The announcement came after Defence Minister Harjit Sajjan halted Coates' planned promotion to lead the NATO Joint Force Command in Naples, Italy, following revelations that Coates had an extramarital affair with an American civilian in Colorado during his tenure as Deputy Commander of NORAD. The Department of National Defence ruled that Coates did not violate any rules of conduct, with Coates having reported the affair at the time to Canadian and American officials.

Notes

References

 

Year of birth missing (living people)
Canadian military personnel of the War in Afghanistan (2001–2021)
Living people
Royal Canadian Air Force generals
Officers of the Order of Military Merit (Canada)